, formerly Naruto stable is a stable of sumo wrestlers, one of the Nishonoseki group of stables.

The stable was established as Naruto stable, on 1 February 1989 by former yokozuna Takanosato Toshihide. The stable's first sekitori was Rikiō in 1994. Four more, Wakanosato, Takanowaka, Takayasu and Kisenosato, have reached sekiwake rank, with Takayasu going on to reach the ōzeki rank, and the stable's first yokozuna being Kisenosato. It had a reputation for being a closed, family-knit stable, as Naruto did not allow his wrestlers to go out and train at other stables (which is unusual in sumo) or socialize with wrestlers from different stables.

Naruto died suddenly on 7 November 2011. The stable's current master, former maegashira Takanotsuru, changed to the Tagonoura toshiyori in December 2013 and renamed the stable accordingly.  Upon changing the stable name, the stable was also moved to the Ryōgoku area from Matsudo, Chiba. It has no connection to the defunct Tagonoura stable established by the late Kushimaumi. As of January 2023 it had 13 wrestlers.

The stable sat out of the January 2022 tournament after four individuals, including the stablemaster, tested positive for COVID-19. The stable withdrew a second time in July 2022 after three wrestlers, including Takayasu, tested positive for the virus.

Ring name conventions
Many wrestlers at this stable have taken ring names or shikona that end with the character 里 (read: sato), meaning village or native place, in deference to their coach and the stable's owner, the deceased former Takanosato.

Owners
2011-present: 16th Tagonoura: (shunin, former maegashira Takanotsuru)
 1989-2011: 13th Naruto: (the 59th yokozuna Takanosato)

Notable active wrestlers

Takayasu Akira (best rank ōzeki)

Notable former members
Kisenosato Yutaka (the 72nd yokozuna)
Wakanosato Shinobu (best rank sekiwake)
Takanowaka Yūki (best rank sekiwake)
Takanotsuru Shinichi (best rank maegashira)
Takanoyama Shuntarō (best rank maegashira)

Coach
Vacant

Referees
Kimura Takao (jūryō gyōji, real name Keiichirō Shigeyama)

Usher
Mitsuaki (makuuchi yobidashi, real name Mitsuaki Kanai)

Hairdresser
Tokonaru (2nd class tokoyama)

Location and access
Tokyo, Edogawa ward, Higashi Koiwa 4-9-20
10 minute walk from Koiwa Station on the Sōbu Line

See also
Naruto-oyakata
List of sumo stables
List of active sumo wrestlers
List of past sumo wrestlers
Glossary of sumo terms

References

External links
Official site 
Japan Sumo Association profile

Active sumo stables